Buttapietra is a comune (municipality) in the Province of Verona in the Italian region Veneto, located about  west of Venice and about  southwest of Verona.

The municipality of Buttapietra contains the frazioni (subdivisions, mainly villages and hamlets) Bovo and Marchesino e Settimo Gallese.

Buttapietra borders the following municipalities: Castel d'Azzano, Isola della Scala, Oppeano, San Giovanni Lupatoto, Verona, and Vigasio.

Demographic evolution

Twin towns
Buttapietra is twinned with:

  Bisenti, Italy

References

External links
 www.comunedibuttapietra.it/

Cities and towns in Veneto